101P/Chernykh is a periodic comet which was first discovered on August 19, 1977, by Nikolaj Stepanovich Chernykh.

In 1991, 101P/Chernykh was observed to split.  JPL concluded that the comet split in April 1991, when 3.3 AU from the Sun.

Fragment B has not been observed since 2006.

References

External links 
 101P/Chernykh – Seiichi Yoshida @ aerith.net
 101P at Gary W. Kronk's Cometography
 
 For 101P/Chernykh-B
 

Periodic comets
0101
Split comets
19770819